Alena Sitsko (born 4 December 1987) is a Belarusian racing cyclist. She competed in the 2013 UCI women's time trial in Florence.

References

External links

1987 births
Living people
Belarusian female cyclists
Place of birth missing (living people)
Cyclists at the 2015 European Games
European Games competitors for Belarus